Johan Henrik Freithoff   (1713 – 24 June 1767) was a Norwegian violinist and composer.

See also
List of Norwegian composers

References
This article was initially translated from the Danish Wikipedia.

External links
 

Norwegian classical violinists
Male classical violinists
Norwegian classical composers
Norwegian male classical composers
Norwegian composers
1713 births
1767 deaths
18th-century classical composers
18th-century male musicians
18th-century musicians